The Dutch intervention in Northern Bali in 1848 was the second in a long series of six Dutch military interventions on Bali island, until total control was achieved with the Dutch intervention in Bali in 1908. The Dutch used as a pretext Balinese salvage claims over shipwrecks, which were customary to the Balinese, but unacceptable under International law.

The expedition arrived in 2,400 men, a third of which was composed of Europeans, the rest being Javanese and Madurese soldiers, as well as one company of Africans, probably from the Dutch colony in Ghana. The force landed in Bali on 7 May 1848 in the area of Sangsit.

The Balinese numbered 16,000, including about 1,500 equipped with firearms under Jelantik. After the Dutch landing, the Balinese withdrew to their fortified position in Jagaraga about 4 kilometers away.

The Dutch attacked the Balinese in Jagaraga despite the intense tropical heat. The Balinese counter-attacked and routed the Dutch, who left 200 dead and had to reimbark on their ships.
  
After this humiliating defeat, the Dutch would return, this time successfully, with the Dutch intervention in Bali (1849).

Notes

Conflicts in 1848
1848 in Southeast Asia
History of Bali
Wars involving the Netherlands
Dutch conquest of Indonesia